Gauze is a thin, translucent fabric with a loose open weave.  In technical terms "gauze" is a weave structure in which the weft yarns are arranged in pairs and are crossed before and after each warp yarn keeping the weft firmly in place.   This weave structure is used to add stability to fabric, which is important when using fine yarns loosely spaced. However, this weave structure can be used with any weight of yarn, and can be seen in some rustic textiles made from coarse hand-spun plant fiber yarns. Gauze is widely used for medical dressings.

Gauze can also be made of non-woven fabric.

Etymology and history
Gauze was traditionally woven in the Gaza region. The English word is said to derive from the place name for Gaza, a center of weaving in the region. Despite a prohibition on trade with non-Christians from religious authorities in medieval Europe, a fine type of silk known as gazzatum was imported from Gaza as early as the 13th century. Though members of religious orders in Europe were forbidden to wear it, the fabric won a place for itself and emerged into modern life as gauze.

According to the French government's online etymological dictionary, the English form of the word derived from the French gaze, whose ultimate origin is uncertain, but is often attributed to the Arabic and Persian word  ("raw silk"), which itself was obtained from the name of Gaza. The same source says the existence of "an ancient textile industry in Gaza is not assured," and it is not known how the word entered into widespread use in European languages, with examples of first usages cited being the medieval Latin forms garza in Bologna in 1250 and gazzatum in Budapest in 1279.

Uses and types
Gauze was originally made of silk and was used for clothing. It is now used for many different things, including gauze sponges for medical purposes.  Modern gauze is also made of synthetic fibers, especially when used in clothing.

Woven versus non-woven
Gauze may be woven or non-woven. Woven gauze is loosely woven, usually from cotton fibers, allowing absorption or wicking of exudate and other fluids. Gauze can be woven with fine or coarse mesh; coarse gauze is useful for medical debridement, while fine gauze is better for packing wounds. Woven gauze is less absorbent than non-woven, and may leave lint in a wound, especially if cut.

Non-woven gauze is made from fibers that are pressed together rather  than woven, providing better absorbency and wicking than woven gauze. Non-woven gauze is usually made from synthetic fibers such as rayon or polyester, or a blend which may include cotton. Non-woven gauze is stronger, bulkier and softer than woven gauze, and produces less lint.

Medical use
When used as a medical dressing, woven gauze is usually made of cotton.
It is especially useful for dressing wounds where other fabrics might stick to the burn or laceration. Many modern medical gauzes are covered with a perforated plastic film such as Telfa or a polyblend which prevents direct contact and further minimizes wound adhesion. Also, it can be impregnated with a thick, creamy mixture of zinc oxide and calamine to promote healing, as in Unna's boot. Gauze is also used during procedures involving accidental tooth loss; either the gauze is used to provide pressure as the tooth is moved back into its corresponding socket, or the tooth is wrapped in gauze and placed in milk or saline to keep it alive while the tooth is being transported or prepared for reinsertion.

Other uses
In film and theatre, gauze is often fashioned into a scrim.

Gauze used in bookbinding is called mull, and is used in case binding to adhere the text block to the book cover.

The term wire gauze is used for woven metal sheets, for example placed on top of a Bunsen burner, or used in a safety lamp or a screen spark arrestor.

See also
 Mesh
 Adhesive bandage
 Lacebark or gauze tree

References

External links

 

Medical dressings
Woven fabrics